Acanthodoras depressus is a species of thorny catfish endemic to Brazil where it is found in the Amazon and Rio Negro basins.

References 

Doradidae
Catfish of South America
Freshwater fish of Brazil
Endemic fauna of Brazil
Fish described in 1881
Taxa named by Franz Steindachner